John Marchant may refer to:
John Le Marchant (British Army officer, born 1803), colonial administrator in Newfoundland Colony
John Marchant (seaman) (1540–1596), sea captain under Sir Francis Drake

See also
John Le Marchant (disambiguation)